Three warships of Japan have borne the name Asahi:

 , a battleship launched in 1899 and sunk in 1942 after being converted to a submarine depot ship
 , a  launched in 1943 as USS Amick she was loaned to Japan between 1955 and 1975
 , an  launched in 2016

Japan Maritime Self-Defense Force ship names
Japanese Navy ship names